This is a list of the members of the Faroese Løgting in the period 2022–current; they were elected at the general snap election on 08 December 2022. The thirty-three elected members are:

References

 2022
2022 in the Faroe Islands
2022-current